Wolfgang Grobe (born 25 July 1956) is a German football coach and a former player. As of June 2011, he works as a scout for FC Bayern Munich. As a player, he spent nine seasons in the Bundesliga with Eintracht Braunschweig and FC Bayern Munich.

Honours
 Bundesliga champion: 1984–85, 1985–86
 DFB-Pokal winner: 1983–84, 1985–86

References

External links
 

1956 births
Living people
Sportspeople from Braunschweig
German footballers
Bundesliga players
2. Bundesliga players
Eintracht Braunschweig players
FC Bayern Munich footballers
FC Bayern Munich non-playing staff
German football managers
1. FC Magdeburg managers
Association football midfielders
Footballers from Lower Saxony